Gumramakhi (Dargwa: Гумрамахьи) is a rural locality (a selo) in Akushinsky Selsoviet, Akushinsky District, Republic of Dagestan, Russia. The population was 644 as of 2010. There are 16 streets.

Geography 
Gumramakhi is located on the left bank of the Akusha River, 4 km south of Akusha (the district's administrative centre) by road. Karsha is the nearest rural locality.

References 

Rural localities in Akushinsky District